Ottoman is an unincorporated community in Lancaster County located on the Northern Neck of the Rappahannock River in the U.S. state of Virginia.

Locustville, a historic plantation house built in 1855, was listed on the National Register of Historic Places in 1994.

Notable people
The American educator Claybrook Cottingham was born in Ottoman in 1881. Also a native of the town was diplomat George H. Steuart, who was born there in 1907. His father, the physician George H. Steuart lived in Ottoman until his death in 1945.

References

Bibliography
 Nelker, Gladys P, The Clan Steuart, Genealogical publishing, 1970.

Unincorporated communities in Lancaster County, Virginia
Unincorporated communities in Virginia